Martina Navratilova and Bob Bryan were the defending champions, but Navratilova retired from the sport at the end of 2006. Bryan partnered Tatiana Golovin, and lost in the second round to Sania Mirza and Mahesh Bhupathi.

Victoria Azarenka and Max Mirnyi won the title, defeating Meghann Shaughnessy and Leander Paes in the final 6–4, 7–6(8–6). This was Azarenka's first Grand Slam title; she would later win 2 Grand Slam singles titles and reach No. 1 in the world.

Seeds

Draw

Finals

Top half

Bottom half

External links
 Draw
2007 US Open – Doubles draws and results at the International Tennis Federation

Mixed Doubles
US Open (tennis) by year – Mixed doubles